Rio is a 1939 American crime film directed by John Brahm and starring Basil Rathbone and Victor McLaglen.

Plot
French financier Paul Reynard (Rathbone) is sentenced to a ten-year term in a South American penal colony for bank fraud. His wife Irene (Gurie) and Paul's faithful servant Dirk (McLaglen) travel to Rio de Janeiro to arrange for Paul's escape. But once she's landed in the Brazilian capital, Irene falls in love with American engineer Bill Gregory (Cummings). After his escape Paul realizes that he's lost his wife forever to a better man. Seeking revenge, he prepares to shoot Bill in cold blood, but Dirk intervenes and kills Reynard instead.

Cast
 Basil Rathbone as Paul Reynard
 Victor McLaglen as Dirk 
 Sigrid Gurie as Irene Reynard 
 Robert Cummings as Bill Gregory 
 Leo Carrillo as Roberto 
 Billy Gilbert as Manuelo 
 Maurice Moscovitch as Old Convict
 Irving Bacon as 'Mushy'
 Samuel S. Hinds as Lamartine 
 Irving Pichel as Rocco
 Ferike Boros as Maria (as Ferika Boras)

Production
In July 1938 Universal announced the film would star Danielle Darrieux who they had under contract and who had made The Rage of Paris for the studio. In October Universal said James Stewart would appear opposite Darrieux in the movie and Joel McCrea would play a role intended for Stewart, Destry Rides Again. In January Hedda Hopper reported that Darrieux did not want to return because she did not like the script for Rio. In March Joe Pasternak insisted that no one else would play her role.

Darrieux's return from France kept being delayed so in June 1939 Sigrid Gurie was cast. Filming started 21 July 1939. It wound up in September.

Reception
The Los Angeles Times called it "a well made melodrama... Rathbone scores heavily... Cummings... received applause lasst night for his work. He should move a lot nearer the top after this performance."

The New York Times said it was "an unmistakable B buzzing like an A" due to Brahm's direction which built "characterization, avoiding the obvious wherever that is possible and digging beneath the externals for psychological elements of suspense and drama... a handful of exceptionally telling sequences... a character gallery of constant interest."

References

External links
 
 
 
 

1939 films
American black-and-white films
1939 crime drama films
American crime drama films
Universal Pictures films
Films directed by John Brahm
Films set in Rio de Janeiro (city)
Films scored by Frank Skinner
1930s American films
1930s English-language films